Radhapur may refer to:

 Radhapur, Nepal
 Radhapur, near Chārpāte, Kachin, Burma

See also
Radhanpur, Gujarat, India
Radhapuram taluk, Tamil Nadu, India